Abdul Ghafar bin Atan (Jawi: عبدالغفار بن أتن; ‎13 July 1956 – 17 November 2021) was a Malaysian politician. He served as Member of the Melaka State Executive Council (EXCO) from March 2008 to May 2018 and again from March 2020 to his death in November 2021, as well as Member of the Melaka State Legislative Assembly (MLA) for Asahan from May 2013 to his death in November 2021 and Gadek from March 2004 to May 2013. He was a member of the United Malays National Organisation (UMNO), a component party of the Barisan Nasional (BN) coalition and also the Alor Gajah UMNO chief.

Politics
Abdul Ghafar first contested as a BN candidate in the 11th general election in the Gadek state constituency in 2004 and went on to defend the seat in the 12th general election in 2008. In the 13th general election in 2013, he contested the Asahan seat and defended it in the 14th general election (GE14) in 2018.

Death
On 4 November 2021, it was announced Abdul Ghafar would not be picked by UMNO as the BN candidate on nomination day on 8 November to give way to younger face to defend the Asahan seat, considered the hottest constituency in the Malacca state election on 20 November.

After being dropped as the election candidate, he was screened and tested positive for COVID-19 at a private hospital on 7 November and when his health deteriorated into critical condition later, he was put under an induced coma in the intensive care unit of Malacca General Hospital on the night of 9 November. Abdul Ghafar subsequently died from the complications at age 65 in the hospital at 1.04pm on 17 November leaving behind his wife, Rabiah Hassan. He was buried according to the COVID-19 pandemic standard operating procedure (SOP) at the Kampung Asahan Muslim Cemetery in Malacca.

Election results

Honours

Honours of Malaysia
  :
  Officer of the Order of the Defender of the Realm (KMN) (2006)
  :
  Companion Class I of the Exalted Order of Malacca (DMSM) – Datuk (2004)
  Knight Commander of the Exalted Order of Malacca (DCSM) – Datuk Wira (2011)
  Grand Commander of the Exalted Order of Malacca (DGSM) – Datuk Seri (2016)

See also
 List of deaths due to COVID-19 - notable individual deaths

References

External links
 

1956 births
2021 deaths
Officers of the Order of the Defender of the Realm
Malaysian people of Malay descent
Malaysian Muslims
United Malays National Organisation politicians
Members of the Malacca State Legislative Assembly
Malacca state executive councillors
Deaths from the COVID-19 pandemic in Malaysia
21st-century Malaysian politicians